Armand Kajangwe, is a Rwandan–Swiss filmmaker. He is best known as the director of critically acclaim films The Asylum , and Dirty Singles.

Career
On April 7, 2009, Kajangwe joined with a full service production company called 'Crooked Seas Inc.' founded by Craig Leblanc which is based in Ontario, Canada. He worked as the director, director of photography, and social media manager of the company.

In 2016, Kajangwe involved to launch of Africa's first video streaming site. The platform is known as 'www.journal.rw' which was developed and run by Innovation Village, a Rwanda-based creative firm where Kajangwe is the executive director. The platform can provides an avenue to share high definition video content.

Filmography

References

External links
 
 Rwandan firm claims first African video streaming platform

Living people
Rwandan film directors
Rwandan film producers
Year of birth missing (living people)